The Shrink Next Door is a podcast by Wondery that tells the story of Isaac Herschkopf, a psychiatrist who abused his relationship with his patients to exploit them for personal gain. The podcast was written and hosted by Joe Nocera. The podcast premiered on May 21, 2019, and consists of 14 episodes.

Episodes

Reception
The Shrink Next Door was the number one podcast for three weeks straight on Apple's podcast charts. It won the 2020 Webby Award for Documentary in the category Podcasts.

TV Adaptation 

On April 23, 2020, it was announced that Apple Inc. had given a straight-to-series order for an 8-episode limited series based on The Shrink Next Door for Apple TV+, and it began airing on November 12, 2021. The adaptation is written by Emmy winning writer Georgia Pritchett and directed by Michael Showalter. Dr. Isaac Herschkopf is played by Paul Rudd, and Martin Markowitz is played by Will Ferrell.

Translations 
 Spanish: El psiquiatra de al lado
 German: Der Therapeut von Nebenan
 French: Mon voisin le Psy
 Portuguese: O Psiquiatra ao lado

See also
 Dr. Death (podcast)
 Psychiatric survivors movement
 List of American crime podcasts
 List of podcast adaptations

References

External links
 

Investigative journalism
Infotainment
Audio podcasts
2019 podcast debuts
Crime podcasts
2019 podcast endings
Podcasts adapted into television shows
Documentary podcasts